is a Japanese fiction writer born in Tokyo.  Known for a sharp, economical style, her work often subverts genres like mystery and noir and focuses on characters that exist outside the gender archetypes of Japanese fiction, which she has described as "stiff and lacking reality." Her novel Baba Yaga no yoru (The Night of Baba Yaga), a yakuza thriller concerned with sisterhood, has been compared to Thelma and Louise and was shortlisted for the Mystery Writers of Japan Award. Otani is lesbian. In December 2021, Big Comic Spirits published a short manga entitled "Sakana ni natta Satsun no hanashi," for which Otani wrote the text and artist Ayumu Hida did the drawings.

Selected works

Story collections
Kanpeki janai, atashitachi（Poplar, 2018）- 23 short stories
Bieru koten serekushon 3: Kaidan, Kidan (Sayusha, 2019) - Boys' love stories adapted from Lafcadio Hearn

Novels
Moujuutsukai to oujisama - Kiniro no fue to midori no honou（Hifumishobo, 2012)
Ayakashi risutorante Kimyou na kyakujin no tame no arakaruto（Shueisha Orange Bunko, 2015）
Tantei shousetsu (misuterii) ni ha mukanai tantei（Shueisha Orange Bunko, 2016）
Baba Yaga no yoru (Kawade Shobo Shinsha, 2020)

Essays
 Douse karada ga meate deshou (Kawade Shobo Shinsha, 2019)

Manga
 Sakana ni natta Satsun no hanashi (Shukan Big Comic Spirits, 2022 Issue 1)

References

1981 births
Living people
21st-century Japanese women writers
Japanese lesbian writers